Randy Scott Holman (born September 18, 1958) is a former Major League Baseball pitcher.  He pitched for the New York Mets in the 1980, 1982, and 1983 baseball seasons.

External links

Baseball players from California
Major League Baseball pitchers
1958 births
Living people
New York Mets players
Wausau Mets players
Jackson Mets players
Tidewater Tides players
Iowa Cubs players
People from Santa Paula, California
Sportspeople from Ventura County, California